Andrew Jackson May (June 24, 1875 – September 6, 1959) was a Kentucky attorney, an influential New Deal-era politician, and chairman of the House Military Affairs Committee during World War II, infamous for his rash disclosure of classified naval information that may have resulted in the loss of 10 American submarines and 800 sailors, and his subsequent unrelated conviction for bribery. May was a Democratic member of United States House of Representatives from Kentucky during the 72nd to 79th sessions of Congress.

Education and early career
May was born on Beaver Creek, near Prestonsburg in Floyd County, Kentucky, on June 24, 1875. On June 25, 1898, he and his twin brother William H. May graduated from Southern Normal University Law School in Huntingdon, Tennessee (later named Union University, Jackson, Tennessee), and was admitted to the bar the same year, commencing his law practice in Prestonsburg. May and his brother formed the law firm of May & May which was not dissolved until the death of his brother on February 20, 1921.  May was county attorney of Floyd County, Kentucky, 1901–1909; special judge of the circuit court of Johnson and Martin Counties in 1925 and 1926. During this time, May also engaged in Democratic Party politics, agricultural pursuits, coal mining and banking.

In 1928, May ran for Congress against Katherine Langley in a heavily Republican district and lost. Two years later he ran again and won in the 1930 election defeating Langley. May was elected as a New Deal Democrat to the Seventy-second Congress and to seven succeeding Congresses (March 4, 1931 – January 3, 1947).  He was Chairman of the powerful Committee on Military Affairs during the Seventy-sixth through Seventy-ninth Congresses, and a consistent supporter of the Franklin D. Roosevelt administration.  During World War II, May became involved with Murray and Henry Garsson, New York businessmen who sought lucrative munitions contracts then being awarded by the U.S. Government.

Chairman of the House Military Affairs Committee
During May's career he helped push through the Social Security Act, and the GI Bill of Rights, both programs central to the New Deal. In 1940, May was credited with being the chief architect of the Peacetime Selective Service Act which provided manpower for the nation's armed forces. The act played a critical role in America's preparedness when Japanese forces bombed Pearl Harbor in December 1941. In a letter to May from Representative John W. McCormack, McCormack wrote: 
                                                     
"As chairman of the all important House Committee on the Military Affairs before Pearl Harbor and during the war, you led the fight for the passage of legislation necessary to defend and preserve our country. You post, as Chairman of the House Military Affairs Committee is not only a most important position but in addition, a most trying one. History will record that the part you played in the passage of necessary legislation would justifiably place you as one of the foremost Americans of this generation."

May was considered neither an isolationist or a warmonger. He did speak out frequently about the war in Europe. May was quoted as saying, "it will not be left up to the President or the Congress or the people of the United States, whether or not we go to war." May continued, "It will be decided by the impersonation of hatred Adolph Hitler, who decided it also for Poland, France, Belgium, and Holland."

The May Incident
May was responsible for a major release of highly confidential military information during World War II known as the May Incident.  U.S. submarines had been conducting a successful undersea war against Japanese shipping during World War II, frequently escaping their anti-submarine depth charge attacks.  May revealed the deficiencies of Japanese depth-charge tactics in a press conference held in June 1943 on his return from a war zone junket.  At this press conference, he revealed the highly sensitive fact that American submarines had a high survival rate because Japanese depth charges were exploding at too shallow a depth. Various press associations sent this leaked news story over their wires and many newspapers published it, including one in Honolulu, Hawaii.

After the news became public, Japanese naval antisubmarine forces began adjusting their depth charges to explode at a greater depth. Vice Admiral Charles A. Lockwood, commander of the U.S. submarine fleet in the Pacific, estimated that May's security breach cost the United States Navy as many as 10 submarines and 800 crewmen killed in action. He said, "I hear Congressman May said the Jap depth charges are not set deep enough.  He would be pleased to know that the Japs set them deeper now."  A report from the U.S. Navy's Pacific Submarine Fleet determined that Japanese anti-submarine warfare (ASW) forces failed to uncover the maximum test depth ability of U.S. fleet submarines during the war.  However, the report made no finding as to whether or not Japanese ASW forces altered their depth charge attacks to deeper settings as a consequence of May's revelation to the press. The incident would not overshadow May's considerable contributions to the war effort as Chairman of Military Affairs. In a 1945 letter to Congressman May, Admiral Richard E. Byrd, Commander in Chief of the United States Fleet wrote: "Everyone in general appreciates the superb job you have done for your country in connection with Army legislation, and Naval officers appreciate in particular the cooperation you have given the Navy."

War profiteering allegations
In 1946, US Senator James Mead began conducting investigations into war profiteering. Sometime shortly before or during the U.S. entry into World War II, May became involved with Murray Garsson and Henry Garsson, New York businessmen with no prior arms manufacturing experience who sought lucrative munitions contracts then being awarded by the U.S. Government.  May was known to frequently telephone army ordnance and other government officials on the Garssons' behalf to award war contracts, obtain draft deferments, and secure other favors for the Garssons and their friends.  So numerous were these interventions that one ordnance official referred to them as "blitz calls."  After the war, a Senate investigating committee reviewing the Garssons' munitions business discovered evidence that May had received substantial cash payments and other inducements from the Garssons. "The Garssons weren't sympathetic characters to the public because they made a lot of money on the war, and they were Jewish, so Representative May got tied with them in the public image and they all sort of got tarred with the same brush as people who somehow made out while people were dying, and illegally so." May had started a business called the Cumberland Lumber Company to build crates for the shipment of the Garssons' munitions. The government's case was based on precept that the money that came to May as a result of the Cumberland Lumber Company was not really that. It was really compensation for making the phone calls to the war department. Ultimately the jury agreed.

Conviction and postwar life
Following news reports of irregularities concerning his conduct in office, May was an unsuccessful candidate for reelection in 1946 to the Eightieth Congress.  The bribery scandal was intensified by testimony of excessive profit-taking in the Garsson munition business, and that the Garsson factory produced 4.2-inch mortar shells with defective fuzes, resulting in premature detonation and the deaths of 38 American soldiers.  After less than two hours of deliberation, May was convicted by a federal jury on July 3, 1947, on charges of accepting bribes to use his position as Chairman of the Military Affairs Committee to secure munitions contracts during the Second World War. Murray and Henry Garsson also received prison terms. May would appeal his verdict all the way up to Supreme Court which refused to hear his case. May was forced into prison at the age of 74. May subsequently served nine months in federal prison.

However, he continued to retain influence in Democratic party politics, and President Truman decided to grant May a full pardon in 1952. Unable to revive his political career, he returned home to practice law until his death.

May died in Prestonsburg, Kentucky on September 6, 1959, and is buried in Mayo Cemetery.

The lodge at Jenny Wiley State Resort Park in Prestonsburg, Kentucky, was named after May by Governor Bert T. Combs.

See also
List of American federal politicians convicted of crimes
List of federal political scandals in the United States
News leak
List of people pardoned or granted clemency by the president of the United States

References

External links

Loose Lips, DO Sink Ships from ww2pacific.com

|-

|-

|-

1875 births
1959 deaths
Democratic Party members of the United States House of Representatives from Kentucky
Kentucky lawyers
Kentucky politicians convicted of crimes
People from Floyd County, Kentucky
Politicians convicted of conspiracy to defraud the United States
Recipients of American presidential pardons
Southern Normal University alumni
American twins
Union University alumni